Carlos Armando Lara Torres , also known as El Charro was an Argentine-born naturalized-Mexican citizen footballer and coach. Born in 1934 in Argentina, Lara died in Mexico City in 2001.

Club career
Born in Argentina, Lara began his football career with Ferro and River Plate. In 1956, he moved to Mexico where he played for Zacatepec, scoring 112 goals and being the top league scorer three times, two of which were consecutive. Lara began to decline in his later years, only achieving eight goals in the 1964-65 season.

He was then sold to Toluca, where he only scored six goals the entire season, then to Necaxa where he scored five in two seasons.

International career
As a naturalized Mexican, he was eligible to play on the Selección de fútbol de México (Mexico national team). Lara debuted on 19 October 1961 in the 1962 World Cup qualifying round, participating in two games against Paraguay national team. He would play two more friendlies in 1962 against Argentina and Colombia, but was unable to travel to the World Cup because of an injury.

International appearances

References

External links
 http://www.elsiglodetorreon.com.mx/noticia/48045.20-aniversario-el-charro-lara-y-julio-mendoza.html

1934 births
2001 deaths
Argentine footballers
Mexican footballers
Mexico international footballers
Naturalized citizens of Mexico
Ferro Carril Oeste footballers
Club Atlético River Plate footballers
Club Atlético Zacatepec players
Deportivo Toluca F.C. players
Club Necaxa footballers
Association football forwards
Sportspeople from Bahía Blanca